Pr0211 c, sometimes written as Pr 0211 c, is a gas giant exoplanet orbiting around the Sun-like star Pr0211, a G-type main sequence star. Pr0211 c and two other planets, Pr0211 b and Pr0201 b are notable for being one of the first exoplanets discovered in the Beehive cluster located in the constellation Cancer, and for being the first multi-planet system discovered in an open cluster. Its host star, Pr0211, is rotationally variable and has a rotation period of 7.97 days.

Discovery
Pr0211 c  was discovered in 2016 by Luca Malavolta and his colleagues while observing its host star with the HARPS-N spectrograph on the  Italian Telescopio Nazionale Galileo (TNG) in La Palma, and the Tillinghast
Reflector Echelle Spectrograph (TRES) mounted at the  telescope at the University of Georgia in the United States.

References

Exoplanets discovered in 2016
Exoplanets detected by radial velocity
Cancer (constellation)